John Valentine Breakwell (1917 – April 16, 1991) was a noted American control theorist and a Professor of Astronautics at Stanford University. He is remembered for his contributions to the "science and applications of astrodynamics, for discovery of flight-trajectory optimization, and for outstanding academic service." He was elected to the National Academy of Engineering in 1981 and a recipient of the Richard E. Bellman Control Heritage Award in 1983.

References

External links
 NAE profile

Control theorists
Richard E. Bellman Control Heritage Award recipients
1917 births
1991 deaths
Stanford University faculty
Members of the United States National Academy of Engineering
Harvard University alumni
Swiss emigrants to the United States